Stina Ståhle (7 September 1907 – 10 January 1971) was a Swedish actress. She appeared in more than 30 films between 1929 and 1962.

Selected filmography

 Say It with Music (1929)
 The Atlantic Adventure (1934)
 Adolf Strongarm (1937)
 Mot nya tider (1939)
 Dunungen (1941)
 Sun Over Klara (1942)
 Imprisoned Women (1943)
 A Girl for Me (1943)
 Kungsgatan (1943)
 Guttersnipes (1944)
 Eaglets (1944)
 I Am Fire and Air (1944)
 Youth in Danger (1946)
 Blue Sky (1955)
 When the Mills are Running (1956)
 The Girl in Tails (1956)
 Synnöve Solbakken (1957)
 A Goat in the Garden (1958)

References

External links

1907 births
1971 deaths
Swedish film actresses
Actresses from Stockholm